Beachville may refer to:

Beachville (Canada), a locality in Canada
Beachville, New Zealand, a locality in New Zealand